The 2022 Volta a la Comunitat Valenciana (English: Tour of the Valencian Community) was a road cycling stage race that took place from 2 to 6 February 2022 in the autonomous community of Valencia in eastern Spain. The race was rated as a category 2.Pro event on the 2022 UCI ProSeries calendar, and was the 73rd edition of the Volta a la Comunitat Valenciana.

Teams 
15 of the 18 UCI WorldTeams and eight UCI ProTeams made up the 23 teams that participated in the race. All but two teams entered a full squad of seven riders;  and  each entered six riders.

Before stage 3,  voluntarily withdrew from the race after two unspecified members of their squad tested positive for COVID-19. Before stage 4,  and  followed suit after two and three unspecified members, respectively, of both teams tested positive. On the other hand,  opted to continue racing after two riders, Juri Hollmann and Einer Rubio, tested positive after stage 1, though both riders were withdrawn. As a result, only 117 of the 159 riders who started the race finished.

UCI WorldTeams

 
 
 
 
 
 
 
 
 
 
 
 
 
 
 

UCI ProTeams

Route

Stages

Stage 1 
2 February 2022 — Les Alqueries to Torralba del Pinar,

Stage 2 
3 February 2022 — Bétera to Torrent,

Stage 3 
4 February 2022 — Alicante to Alto de las Antenas del Maigmó Tibi,

Stage 4 
5 February 2022 — Orihuela to Torrevieja,

Stage 5 
6 February 2022 — Paterna to Valencia,

Classification leadership table 

 On stage 2, Aleksandr Vlasov, who was second in the points classification, wore the orange jersey, because first-placed Remco Evenepoel wore the yellow jersey as the leader of the general classification. For the same reason, Fabio Jakobsen wore the orange jersey on stage 3, while Carlos Rodríguez, who was second in the young rider classification, wore the white jersey on stages 2 and 3.
 On stages 4 and 5, Carlos Rodríguez, who was third in the points classification, wore the orange jersey, because first-placed Aleksandr Vlasov wore the yellow jersey as the leader of the general classification, and second-placed Remco Evenepoel wore the white jersey as the leader of the young rider classification.

Final classification standings

General classification

Points classification

Mountains classification

Young rider classification

Team classification

References

Sources

External links 
 

2022
Volta a la Comunitat Valenciana
Volta a la Comunitat Valenciana
Volta a la Comunitat Valenciana